Polyglycylation is a form of posttranslational modification of glutamate residues of the carboxyl-terminal region tubulin in certain microtubules (e.g.,  axonemal) originally discovered in Paramecium, and later shown in mammalian neurons as well.

See also
Polyglutamylation

References

Post-translational modification
Protein structure